The Floyd River is a tributary of the Missouri River,  long, in northwestern Iowa in the United States.  It enters the Missouri at Sioux City, and is named for Charles Floyd, a member of the Lewis and Clark Expedition.

Course
The Floyd River rises in northwestern O'Brien County near the town of Sanborn and flows generally southwestwardly through Sioux, Plymouth and Woodbury counties, past the towns of Sheldon, Hospers, Alton, Le Mars, Merill, and Hinton.  At Merrill the Floyd collects its largest tributary, the West Branch Floyd River, which is about 40 mi (65 km) long.  The West Branch rises near Boyden in northeastern Sioux County and flows generally southward into Plymouth County, past Maurice and Struble. The Floyd enters Woodbury County near the Leeds neighborhood of Sioux City.

The Floyd River has come out of its banks on several occasions, causing disastrous flooding in Sioux City in 1892 and 1953. The river has since been the focus of an intensive flood control project. The Floyd's lower channel through Sioux City has been straightened, channelized, lined with riprap and banked by a high earthen levee.

The Floyd River is the site of frequent fish kills caused by runoff of massive amounts of animal waste from farm feedlots into the river.

Charles Floyd
Charles Floyd, for whom the river is named, was a U.S. Army sergeant who was born in Kentucky and was one of the first to enlist in the Lewis and Clark Expedition. On August 19, 1804, just three months into the two-year journey, Floyd became violently ill and died the next day of what is believed to have been a ruptured appendix. He was buried on a hill overlooking an unnamed river on the Iowa side of the Missouri River. In his honor, the expedition's leaders, Meriwether Lewis and William Clark, named the river Floyd River and the hill Floyd's Bluff. Floyd was the expedition's only casualty, despite the many dangers encountered in the 8,000 miles traveled in reaching the Pacific Ocean and returning to St. Louis.

Gallery

See also
List of Iowa rivers

Notes

References
Columbia Gazetteer of North America entry
DeLorme (1998).  Iowa Atlas & Gazetteer.  Yarmouth, Maine: DeLorme.  .

Rivers of Iowa
Tributaries of the Missouri River
Rivers of O'Brien County, Iowa
Rivers of Plymouth County, Iowa
Sioux City, Iowa
Rivers of Sioux County, Iowa
Rivers of Woodbury County, Iowa